Stelio Candelli (born 28 March 1931) is an Italian film, stage and television actor.

Life and career 
Born in Trieste, the son of civil servants, in 1954 Candelli enrolled at the Accademia d'Arte Drammatica in Rome, graduating in 1957. The same year he made his film debut in Alberto Lattuada's Guendalina. Especially in the 1960s and in the 1970s Candelli got main roles in numerous genre films, often  credited as Stanley Kent. He was also active on stage and on television, and is best remembered for his role as Danny Scipio, a former Mafia member turned crime investigator, in the BBC TV series Vendetta (1966-68).

Filmography

References

External links 

 

1931 births
Actors from Trieste
Italian male film actors
Italian male stage actors
Italian male television actors
Living people
Accademia Nazionale di Arte Drammatica Silvio D'Amico alumni